Daejeon Convention Center, also known as simply DCC is the convention center run by the Daejeon Tourism Organization and the sole convention center for the city.

Facilities

The first building, known as DCC1, was opened in 2008 with four exhibition halls and three medium-sized meeting rooms on the first floor and two grand ballrooms on the second floor. DCC2 opened in 2022 with a usable space of 49,754 square meters, which is roughly four times as much space as DCC1. The new building can accommodate 8,000 people. It is a three story structure with four exhibition halls on the first floor and three meeting rooms on the third floor. DCC2 was built on the site of the Daejeon Trade Exhibition Hall.

See also
 Expo Science Park
 Institute for Basic Science
 National Science Museum

References

External links

Promotional video

Buildings and structures in Daejeon
Daejeon